Bismabenzene is the parent representative of a group of organobismuth compounds that are related to benzene with a carbon atom replaced by a bismuth atom. Bismabenzene itself has been synthesised but not isolated because it is too reactive, tending to instead dimerize in a Diels-Alder addition.

An unstable derivative with 4-alkyl substituents was reported in 1982. A stable derivative was reported in 2016. This derivative has two tri(isopropyl)silyl substituents in the ortho-positions and was synthesized from aluminacyclohexadiene, bismuth trichloride, and DBU.

References

Organobismuth compounds
Bismuth heterocycles
Six-membered rings